Horrabad-e Olya (also Romanized as Ḩorrābād-e ‘Olyā) is a village in Pishkuh-e Zalaqi Rural District, Besharat District, Aligudarz County, Lorestan Province, Iran. At the 2006 census, its population was 223, in 36 families.

References 

Towns and villages in Aligudarz County